The Finnish Cup (Suomen Cup, or Finska cupen) in bandy was played for the first time in 1960 and has been played on and off since then. The competition has now been held annually since 2014. It is arranged by Finland's Bandy Association.

Finals

References

National bandy cups
Bandy in Finland
Bandy competitions in Finland